The Golden Eagle was a 1930s public house in Birmingham, England, which became known as a venue for live music.

The pub stood on Hill Street, in Birmingham City Centre, between Victoria Square and the western end of New Street Station.

It closed in January 1984 and was demolished soon afterwards.

Architecture 

The building, commissioned by the Holt Brewery Company (and later operated by their successors, Ansells Brewery), in art deco style was clad in black stone, with a bas relief carving of a stylised golden eagle, by sculptor William Bloye, over the main entrance.

It was erected in the 1930s on the site of an earlier pub of the same name.

Music 

It was at the Golden Eagle, in 1963, that Spencer Davis met brothers Steve (then aged 14 and still at school) and Muff Winwood, performing there as the Muffy Wood Jazz Band, resulting in them forming the Spencer Davis Group. The Spencer Davis Group made their debut at the Eagle, and subsequently had a Monday-night residency here.

Other bands who played there before going on to bigger things include Iron Maiden and U2.

For a year from June 1973, the pub was home to a folk club, run by resident Birmingham folk/rock band Scotch Mist and, from 1976 to 1979, a club night, "Shoop Shoop", held on Thursdays. Shoop Shoop was run by Mike Horseman and Pete King, the latter of whom went on to manage Steel Pulse.

Legacy 

In August 2018, Birmingham-based Two Towers brewery launched a "Golden Eagle" ruby ale, in their "Gone but Not Forgotten" range, to commemorate the pub.

The site of the pub subsequently became a car park.

References

External links 

 'Birmingham Music Archive' page
 'Closed Pubs' page (includes picture)
 'Keith Jones Music' page with a picture showing the Bloye carving

Pubs in Birmingham, West Midlands
Music in Birmingham, West Midlands
Art Deco architecture in England
Former pubs in England
Buildings and structures completed in the 1930s
Demolished buildings and structures in the West Midlands (county)
Buildings and structures demolished in 1984